Norbert Barlicki (6 June 1880, in Sieciechów, Radom Governorate, Congress Poland – 27 September 1941, in Auschwitz) was a Polish publicist, lawyer and politician of the Polish Socialist Party (PPS).

Barlicki was murdered during the Second World War in the German concentration camp Auschwitz.

See also 
List of Nazi-German concentration camps
The Holocaust in Poland
World War II casualties of Poland

References

1880 births
1941 deaths
People from Kozienice County
People from Radom Governorate
Polish Socialist Party – Left politicians
Polish Socialist Party politicians
Polish People's Party "Wyzwolenie" politicians
Government ministers of Poland
Members of the Legislative Sejm of the Second Polish Republic
Members of the Sejm of the Second Polish Republic (1922–1927)
Members of the Sejm of the Second Polish Republic (1928–1930)
Members of the Sejm of the Second Polish Republic (1930–1935)
20th-century Polish lawyers
Polish publicists
Polish civilians killed in World War II
Polish people who died in Auschwitz concentration camp
Politicians who died in Nazi concentration camps